Palaina pusilla is a species of minute land snail with an operculum, a terrestrial gastropod mollusk or micromollusks in the family Diplommatinidae. This species is endemic to Palau.

References

 Mollusc Specialist Group 1996.  Palaina pusilla.   2006 IUCN Red List of Threatened Species.   Downloaded on 7 August 2007.

Palaina
Endemic fauna of Palau
Molluscs of Oceania
Molluscs of the Pacific Ocean
Taxonomy articles created by Polbot